Johan Wilhelm Palmstruch (3 March 1770 – 30 August 1811) was a soldier, artist and naturalist. 

Palmstruch was born in Stockholm and died at Vänersborg in Västra Götaland County, Sweden. 

Palmstruch was a Swedish military officer who served as Captain in the Cavalry. Between 1797 and 1798, Palmstruch was an instructor at the Fribyggarordens Lyceum. He was compared to English naturalist, James Sowerby (1757–1822). He contributed in the publication of two vast volumes of work of natural history; Svensk Botanik which was first published in 1802 and Svensk Zoologi first published in 1806.

See also
Conrad Quensel
Johan Gustaf Ruckman
Olof Swartz
Gustaf Johan Billberg

References

External links 
BDH  Svensk Botanik from the Biodiversity Heritage Library
Svensk Zoologi from the Biodiversity Heritage Library

Swedish naturalists
1770 births
1811 deaths